OCF may refer to:

 Ocala International Airport, in Ocala, Florida
 Off Center Fed antenna, a dipole antenna with specific placement of feedpoint allowing multiple resonances in HF band
 Officers' Christian Fellowship, a nonprofit Christian parachurch organization which serves the U.S. Military
 Open channel flow, Flow of a fluid with its surface exposed to the atmosphere
 Open Cluster Framework, a clustering standard in computing
 Open Computing Facility, at University of California, Berkeley
 Open Connectivity Foundation, the biggest industrial connectivity standard organization for IoT.
 Open Container Format (also OEBPS Container Format) in the specification for E-Books in the ePUB format.
 OpenBSD Cryptographic Framework, an OpenBSD initiative to provide operating system support for cryptographic acceleration hardware.
 Operating cash flow, a term in financial accounting
 Optimum Coding in the Frequency Domain
 Ordinal collapsing function, a process used for reaching large ordinals in the field of set theory
 Ordnance Clothing Factory, Avadi, Shahjahanpur, India
 Oregon Country Fair, an annual event in Veneta, Oregon
 Original Composite Font, an early CJK font format by Adobe Systems
 Orthodox Christian Fellowship, a North American Orthodox campus ministry
 Our Common Future, a 1987 report from the United Nations World Commission on Environment and Development (WCED)
 Owens Corning Fiberglass, a manufacturer of fiberglass insulation
 Observable canonical form